Robin Janelle Confer (born February 21, 1976) is an American former soccer player who played as a forward, making eight appearances for the United States women's national team.

Career
Confer played for the Clearwater Central Marauders in high school, where she scored 277 goals and was named a Parade High-School All-American. In college, she played for the North Carolina Tar Heels, helping the team to win the NCAA championship in 1994, 1996, and 1997. She was a Soccer America First-Team and NSCAA Third-Team All-American in 1997, and was chosen as a Freshman All-American in 1994 by Soccer America. The same year she was chosen by Soccer Buzz and Soccer News as the National Player of the Year, and was a finalist for the Hermann Trophy. She was included in the NCAA All-Tournament team in all four seasons, including 1997 when she was chosen as the tournament's offensive MVP. In total, she scored 77 goals and recorded 55 assists in 107 appearances for the Tar Heels. She ranks fourth in career points (goals and assists) at Carolina with 209, fifth in goals, and sixth in assists. She also holds the joint-NCAA record for most games played, along with Kristi Eveland, having never missed a game in her collegiate career.

Confer began her national career with the U.S. under-21 team, where she was a captain. She made her international debut for the United States on January 18, 1996 in a friendly match against Ukraine. In total, she made eight appearances for the U.S. and scored one goal, earning her final cap on December 16, 1998 in another friendly match against Ukraine.

In club soccer, Confer played for the Raleigh Wings in 1998, as well as the New Jersey Lady Stallions. She was selected by the Boston Breakers in the 2000 WUSA Draft, where she made one appearance during the 2001 season. However, a back injury cut her playing career short.

Confer was included in the Atlantic Coast Conference Top 50 Honorees. She later began coaching, working as the assistant for the North Carolina Tar Heels (as a volunteer), Mississippi State Bulldogs, Texas A&M Aggies, Florida State Seminoles, and Georgia Bulldogs. In 2014, she was appointed as the head coach of the North Florida Ospreys women's soccer team, where she remained until her resignation in 2018 in order to pursue opportunities outside coaching. She also has coached as part of the U.S. Youth Soccer Olympic Development Program. In 2019, Confer worked as the director of softball operations for the Georgia Bulldogs.

Personal life
Confer is a native of Clearwater, Florida. She earned a bachelor's degree in exercise and sports science from the University of North Carolina at Chapel Hill in 1998.

Career statistics

International

International goals

References

External links
 North Carolina player profile
 North Carolina career summary
 North Florida Ospreys coaching summary

1976 births
Living people
Sportspeople from Clearwater, Florida
Soccer players from Florida
American women's soccer players
American women's soccer coaches
United States women's international soccer players
Women's association football forwards
North Carolina Tar Heels women's soccer players
Boston Breakers (WUSA) players
USL W-League (1995–2015) players
Women's United Soccer Association players
North Florida Ospreys
Raleigh Wings players